Black Bottom can refer to several things. In many cities, the term has been used to describe African American neighborhoods.  

Black Bottom, Alabama
Black Bottom, Detroit, a historical former neighborhood in Detroit, Michigan
Black Bottom, Kentucky, in Harlan County, Kentucky
Black Bottom Historic District, in Russellville, Logan County, Kentucky
Black Bottom (Philadelphia), a former neighborhood in Philadelphia, Pennsylvania
Black Bottom, West Virginia
Black Bottom (dance)
Black bottom pie, a pie with a layer of chocolate pastry cream or pudding 
Black Bottom Stomp, jazz composition
"Black Bottom", a 1982 single by The Troggs